Irbene is a ghost town in Ance parish, northwestern Latvia. In 1971, the Soviet Union established a secret radar center "Звезда" ("Star" in Russian; later acquired by Ventspils Starptautiskais Radioastronomijas Centrs in 1990s) and built a settlement for military officers and their families, naming it Irbene because of nearby river Irbe. The town had a school, shop, sport and concert halls. However, the town was not marked on maps. Only the holders of a special permit were able to access Irbene. After the withdrawal of the Soviet Army in 1993 the town became abandoned.

References 

Ghost towns in Latvia
Ventspils Municipality